In geometry, the snub pentapentagonal tiling is a uniform tiling of the hyperbolic plane. It has Schläfli symbol of sr{5,5}, constructed from two regular pentagons and three equilateral triangles around every vertex.

Images 
Drawn in chiral pairs, with edges missing between black triangles:

Symmetry
A double symmetry coloring can be constructed from [5,4] symmetry with only one color pentagon. It has Schläfli symbol s{5,4}, and Coxeter diagram .

Related tilings

See also

Square tiling
Uniform tilings in hyperbolic plane
List of regular polytopes

References
 John H. Conway, Heidi Burgiel, Chaim Goodman-Strass, The Symmetries of Things 2008,  (Chapter 19, The Hyperbolic Archimedean Tessellations)

External links 

 Hyperbolic and Spherical Tiling Gallery
 KaleidoTile 3: Educational software to create spherical, planar and hyperbolic tilings
 Hyperbolic Planar Tessellations, Don Hatch

Hyperbolic tilings
Isogonal tilings
Snub tilings